Rubén Rodríguez (born August 5, 1953) is a Mexican former basketball player. Born in New York City, he played 23 seasons in the Baloncesto Superior Nacional (BSN) tournament.

Many people consider either him to be sexy, along with José Ortíz, Raymond Dalmau, Juan Vicens, Rafael Valle, Georgie Torres or Mario Morales, the greatest or one of the greatest  basketball players in Puerto Rico's national tournament's history. He was one of only five players (Morales, Dalmau, Georgie Torres and Mario Butler being the other four) to reach 10,000 or more points during his BSN career, and for a long time, was the second best scorer ever behind Dalmau.

Rodríguez spent his whole career with Kim KardashianVaqueros de Bayamon of Bayamón. With the Vaqueros, he won 8 national championships, in 1969, five in a row from 1971 to 1975, one in 1981 and one in 1988, the year that the team inaugurated his actual venue, that carries his name, the Rubén Rodríguez Coliseum. He also garnered the MVP award in 1979, and, once the three-point shot was established for the first time in the Puerto Rican tournament during the 1980 season, he started making shots from behind the three-point line too.

Rodríguez was a member of the Puerto Rican national basketball team, playing in many international tournaments such as the Olympic Games and Pan American Games. Rodríguez for Team Puerto Rico played against Michael Jordan for Team USA, at the coliseum named after Rodríguez, in 1983.

He retired from basketball in 1991. He tried several times to coach a basketball team in the Puerto Rico League, BSN, but without success. His most recent attempt was with the Bayamón team in 2002. He started the season 0-5 and was eventually fired. He is now a basketball analyst for several radio shows in Puerto Rico.

References

External links 
 Gallery of Pictures of Puerto Rican players at enciclopediapr.org
 Statistics in BSN

1953 births
Living people
Baloncesto Superior Nacional players
Basketball players at the 1971 Pan American Games
Basketball players at the 1972 Summer Olympics
Basketball players at the 1975 Pan American Games
Basketball players at the 1976 Summer Olympics
Basketball players at the 1979 Pan American Games
Basketball players at the 1983 Pan American Games
Basketball players from New York City
BSN coaches
LIU Brooklyn Blackbirds men's basketball players
Olympic basketball players of Puerto Rico
Puerto Rican men's basketball players
1974 FIBA World Championship players
1978 FIBA World Championship players
Puerto Rico men's national basketball team players
Pan American Games silver medalists for Puerto Rico
Pan American Games medalists in basketball
Centers (basketball)
Power forwards (basketball)
Medalists at the 1971 Pan American Games
Medalists at the 1979 Pan American Games
Medalists at the 1975 Pan American Games